The Dark Night of the Soul is a phase of passive purification of the spirit in the mystical development, as described by the 16th-century Spanish mystic and poet St. John of the Cross in his treatise Dark Night, a commentary on his poem with the same name. It follows after the second phase, the illumination in which God's presence is felt, but this presence is not yet stable. The author himself did not give any title to his poem, which together with this commentary and the Ascent of Mount Carmel forms a treatise on the active and passive purification of the senses and the spirit, leading to mystical union. In modern times, the phrase "dark night of the soul" has taken on the broader meaning of spiritual dryness and existential doubt and loneliness.

The poem

Dating and subject
The poem of St. John of the Cross, in eight stanzas of five lines each, narrates the journey of the soul to the mystical union with God. The time or place of composition are not certain. It is likely that the poem was written between 1577 and 1579. It has been proposed that the poem was composed while John was imprisoned in Toledo, although the few explicit statements in this regard are unconvincing and second-hand.

The journey is called "dark night" in part because darkness represents the fact that the destination "God" is unknowable, as in the 14th-century mystical classic The Cloud of Unknowing; both pieces are derived from the works of Pseudo-Dionysius the Areopagite in the 6th century. Further, the path per se is unknowable. The "dark night" does not refer to the difficulties of life in general, although the phrase has been taken to refer to such trials.

Text

Translation by Edgar Allison Peers

Commentaries by John of the Cross

Both works were left uncompleted.

The Ascent of Mount Carmel is divided into three books that reflect the two phases of the dark night. The first is a purification of the senses (titled "The Active Night of the Senses"). The second and third books describe the more intense purification of the spirit (titled "The Active Night of the Spirit"). The active purgation of the senses comprises the first of the classical three stages of the mystical journey, followed by those of illumination and then union. The passive purgation of the spirit takes place between illumination and full union, when the presence of God has already been felt but is not stable. 

At the beginning of the commentary Dark Night, John wrote: "In this first verse, the soul tells the mode and manner in which it departs, as to its affection, from itself and from all things, dying through a true mortification to all of them and to itself, to arrive at a sweet and delicious life with God."

The dark night of the soul is a stage of final and complete purification, and is marked by confusion, helplessness, stagnation of the will, and a sense of the withdrawal of God's presence. It is the period of final "unselfing" and the surrender to the hidden purposes of the divine will. The final stage is union with the object of love, the one Reality, God. Here the self has been permanently established on a transcendental level and liberated for a new purpose.

Contemporary understanding
The term "dark night (of the soul)" is used as referring to spiritual dryness, the absence of experiencing the presence of God, but also more generally "to describe an extremely difficult and painful period in one's life". 

This spiritual dryness may endure for a long time. The "dark night" of St. Paul of the Cross in the 18th century endured 45 years, from which he ultimately recovered. The dark night of Mother Teresa, whose own name in religion she selected in honor of Thérèse of Lisieux, "may be the most extensive such case on record", having endured from 1948 almost until her death in 1997, with only brief interludes of relief, according to her letters.

Other authors have made similar references: 

Inayat Khan states, "There can be no rebirth without a dark night of the soul, a total annihilation of all that you believed in and thought that you were." Joseph Campbell states "The dark night of the soul comes just before revelation. When everything is lost, and all seems darkness, then comes the new life and all that is needed."

Roberto Assagioli states: Before the full and final victory, however, the soul has to undergo another test: it must pass through the "dark night" which is a new and deeper experience of annihilation, or a crucible in which all the human elements that go to make it up are melted together. But the darkest nights are followed by the most radiant dawns and the soul, perfect at last, enters into complete, constant and inseparable communion with the Spirit, so that – to use the bold statement employed by St John of the Cross – "it seems to be God himself and has the same characteristics as him".

See also
Ego death
Existential crisis
Loevinger; Loevinger's stages of ego development
Dabrowski; Theory of positive disintegration
Kenosis
Lawrence Kohlberg; Kohlberg's stages of moral development
Nigredo
Psychology of religion
Divinization (Christian)

Notes

References

Sources

Further reading

External links

Poem

 Dark Night of the Soul verse translation of the poem.
 Text of Dark Night of the Soul from the Christian Classics Ethereal Library
 Original and Translation of Dark Night of the Soul From The Collected Works of St. John of the Cross

St. John's commentary
 Online version of Dark Night of the Soul

Modern interpretations
 The chapter titled "The Dark Night of the Soul" from Evelyn Underhill's Mysticism at Gnostic.org.
 Summary of The Dark Night of the Soul by St. John of the Cross
 

Christian mysticism
16th-century Christian texts
Books by John of the Cross
Christian devotional literature
Christian literature
1578 works
1585 works